"Les Valses de Vienne" is a 1989 song originally recorded by the French artist François Feldman for his 1989 album, Une Présence and was the second singles release from that album in November of the same year. It achieved great success in France, topping the chart for six nonconsecutive weeks, and remains Feldman's signature song and a classic of 1980s French music.

Song information
The lyrics were written and the music composed by Feldman himself and the songwriter Jean-Marie Moreau. According to the expert of French chart Elia Habib, the song is a "romantic ballad, whose identity remains a salve savour in the subject as well as in the musical coloration". The song is based on a pun and all the text is declined as well, juggling with the likeness and the consonance of terms between them (e.g. "dans la Rome antique, errent les romantiques"). The part played by the violins was written by Thierry Durbet.
		
The song was also included on the singer's three best of compilations: Two Feldman (1996), Best Feldman (1998) and Gold (2008); it was also performed during Feldman's 1991 tour and was thus included on the live album Feldman à Bercy (1992).

The music video features Feldman with a young girl who portrayed his daughter and who tries to comfort her father because he is separated from her mother. The cover on the CD maxi and vinyls is a screenshot from the video.

Chart performances
In France, "Les Valses de Vienne" started at number 38 on the chart edition of 23 November 1989, then climbed quickly and entered the top ten three weeks later. It was blocked for three weeks at number two by Roch Voisine's hit "Hélène", then reached number one for four weeks, then was dislodged by "Hélène" for two weeks, and eventually returned at the top for additional two weeks. Then it almost did not stop to drop rather quickly and fell off the top 50 after 23 weeks of presence. It achieved Gold status awarded by the Syndicat National de l'Édition Phonographique.

In 2003, the French program Top 50: 50 numéros 1 de légende revealed that the song was the 26th best received number-one hit of the Top 50 (SNEP Singles Chart) thanks to the votings of the TV viewers.

Track listings
 7" single
 "Les Valses de Vienne" — 3:56
 "Les Valses de Vienne" (instrumental) — 4:02

 7" maxi
 "Les Valses de Vienne" (extended version) — 5:08
 "Les Valses de Vienne" — 4:02

 CD maxi
 "Les Valses de Vienne" (single version) — 3:56
 "Longue nuit" — 4:39
 "Pour faire tourner le monde" — 3:50
 "Les Valses de Vienne" (instrumental) — 4:02

Credits
 Produced by Jean Fredenucci for Big Bang
 Mixed by Dominique Blanc-Francard
 Editions: Marilu Music / Carole Line, 1989 Phonogram
 Photos: Claude Gassian / Thierry Bouêt
 Design: Antonietti / Pascault & Ass.

Charts

Weekly charts

Year-end charts

Certifications

See also
 List of number-one singles of 1990 (France)

References

1989 singles
François Feldman songs
SNEP Top Singles number-one singles
Pop ballads
1989 songs
Phonogram Records singles